Mo Elsalhy (born March 20, 1971) is a politician, pharmacist and businessman from Alberta, Canada. He received his Bachelor of Science in Pharmacy from the University of Alberta in 1994.

Political career 

Elsalhy contested the nomination for Edmonton McClung against Maurice Tougas in 2004, and started campaigning three months before the nomination day. He was elected as a Member of the Legislative Assembly of Alberta representing Edmonton McClung in the 2004 general election for the Alberta Liberal Party. Despite being heavily outspent, he defeated Mark Norris, the only cabinet minister to lose a seat in this election. He was then assigned the role of Critic for the Government Services and Innovation and Science portfolios by Opposition Leader Kevin Taft. He was also made Deputy House Leader and was chosen Shadow Minister of Justice and Attorney General and Shadow Solicitor General and Minister of Public Security. He also chaired the Democratic Renewal Committee for the Official Opposition and was appointed Deputy Chair of the all-party Standing Policy Field Committee for Government Services.

He was defeated in the 2008 election by Progressive Conservative David Xiao.

On July 25, 2008, Elsalhy declared his intention to seek the leadership of the Alberta Liberal Party. He received 11% of the vote which was conducted through a mail-in process. David Swann won that contest and was declared Leader on December 13, 2008. In March 2009, Elsalhy was asked by Swann to lead a seven-member renewal team. The work of his 'Renewal Committee' concluded in July 2009.

On October 23, 2010, Elsalhy was nominated to stand for election again. He was acclaimed as the Alberta Liberal candidate to run in Edmonton-McClung in the 2011/12 provincial election.

In the summer of 2018, he announced his intention to seek a nomination from the Alberta Party for the 2019 election, held in April 2019, running in the constituency of Edmonton-South West where he captured 11.6% of the vote.

Personal life
Elsalhy is married with three children. His pastimes include soccer and swimming.

Electoral record

2019 general election

2012 general election

2008 general election

2004 general election

References

External links 
Constituency Edmonton McClung Constituency Association
Mo Elsalhy campaign site
Alberta Liberal candidate biography
Mo Elsalhy interview in the Real Estate Weekly
Liberal leadership candidates debut, ATA News, Vol. 43 #5
Candidates for Liberal leadership race debate over election platforms, The Gateway, October 23, 2008

Living people
Elsalhy, Moe
Egyptian emigrants to Canada
21st-century Canadian politicians
1971 births
Canadian politicians of Egyptian descent
Alberta Party candidates in Alberta provincial elections